Rottach may refer to:

Rottach-Egern, a municipality of Miesbach in Upper Bavaria, Germany
Rottach (Iller, Rettenberg), a river of Bavaria, Germany, right tributary of the Iller at the boundary between the municipalities Sulzberg and Rettenberg
Rottach (Iller, Kempten), a river of Bavaria, Germany, left tributary of the Iller at Kempten
Rottach (Tegernsee), a river of Bavaria, Germany, tributary of the Tegernsee